So, Who's Paranoid is the tenth studio album by English punk rock band the Damned. Released in November 2008, it was their first album in seven years. It was funded by the band themselves and released on their English Channel label. Musically, the album largely draws from the band's 1980s gothic rock sound.

Reception
Guardian critic Dave Simpson thought it was their best album in a while and said the album "takes a lead from 1980's superb The Black Album by skipping through genres" and "fabulous pop anthems such as "Perfect Sunday" may find them a new audience even now." While Cameron Gordon, writing for Chart Attack, wasn't so kind. He said the album "blows", was "a really tedious album to absorb" and contains "either generic pop-punk blandness or self-indulgent silliness". Allmusic critic Mark Deming said " there is practically nothing on So, Who's Paranoid? that resembles punk rock as we know it", he suggested it was more likely to appeal to people who liked the band's later albums, like Strawberries and Phantasmagoria. Slant Magazine said it "rises above mediocrity" but Record Collector said it was a "beautifully controlled blend of melody and dynamic".

The closing track "Dark Asteroid" is a tribute to Pink Floyd founder Syd Barrett, who died two years previously.

Track listing
Songwriting credits adapted from BMI.

All songs written by Captain Sensible, except where noted.

"A Nation Fit for Heroes" (Sensible, Martin Newell) – 3:57
"Under the Wheels" (Sensible, Pinch) – 5:02 
"Dr. Woofenstein" (Sensible, Pinch) – 5:54 
"Shallow Diamonds" – 3:34 
"Since I Met You" (Monty Oxymoron) – 4:07 
"A Danger to Yourself" – 4:04 
"Maid for Pleasure" – 4:34 
"Perfect Sunday" (Sensible, Dave Vanian) – 4:42 
"Nature's Dark Passion" (Oxymoron) – 4:11 
"Little Miss Disaster" – 4:23 
"Just Hangin'" – 3:58 
"Nothing" (Sensible, Stu West) – 3:41 
"Dark Asteroid" – 14:02 
(a). "Dark Asteroid Part 1"
(b). "Dark Asteroid Part 2" (Sensible, Vanian, Oxymoron, West, Pinch)
Reissue bonus tracks 
"Half Forgotten Memories" – 6:02	
"Aim to Please" – 2:43	
"Time" (B-side to "A Nation Fit for Heroes") – 3:41

Personnel 
Credits adapted from the album's liner notes.

The Damned
Dave Vanian – lead vocals
Captain Sensible – guitar, backing vocals
Monty Oxymoron – keyboards, backing vocals
Pinch – drums, backing vocals
Stu West – bass

Additional musicians
Bela Emerson – cello, saw on "Nature's Dark Passion"
The Brighton Gay Men's Chorus – vocal harmonies on "Dr. Woofenstein"
Lorraine Bowen – conductor, arranger on "Dr. Woofenstein"
Technical
Adam Whittaker – engineer, mixing on "Nature's Dark Passion", "Since I Met You" and "Dark Asteroid"
Jim Spencer – mixing
Ewan Davies – engineer on "Perfect Sunday" and "Little Miss Disaster", mixing on "Little Miss Disaster"
Ben Moore – engineer (drum tracks) on "Dr. Woofenstein"
Adrian Wear – artwork, sleeve design

Release history

References 

The Damned (band) albums
2008 albums